Dave Inkpen (born September 4, 1954 in Edmonton, Alberta) is a Canadian retired professional ice hockey player who played 293 games in the World Hockey Association.  He played for the Indianapolis Racers, Quebec Nordiques, Cincinnati Stingers, Edmonton Oilers, and New England Whalers.

Career statistics

External links

1954 births
Living people
Canadian ice hockey defencemen
Cincinnati Stingers draft picks
Cincinnati Stingers players
Des Moines Capitols players
Edmonton Oil Kings (WCHL) players
Edmonton Oilers (WHA) players
Essen Mosquitoes players
Flint Generals players
Fort Worth Texans players
Ice hockey people from Edmonton
Indianapolis Racers players
Iserlohn Roosters players
New England Whalers players
New York Islanders draft picks
Quebec Nordiques (WHA) players
Springfield Indians players